Gafford may refer to:

People
Carl Gafford (born 1953), American comics artist
Daniel Gafford (born 1998), American basketball player
Monk Gafford (1920–1987), American football player
Ray Gafford (1914–1990), American golfer
Rico Gafford (born 1996), American football player
Thomas Gafford (born 1983), American football player

Places
Gafford, Texas, an unincorporated community in Hopkins County, Texas